A-Mart was an American discount supermarket chain that operated in the Eastern United States from 1969, until all locations were renamed (because of a legal threat from similarly named rival Kmart) by its parent company, the Great Atlantic and Pacific Tea Company (A&P), to that name by 1972.

References 

Retail companies established in 1969
American companies disestablished in 1972
Defunct supermarkets of the United States
The Great Atlantic & Pacific Tea Company
American companies established in 1969